Rufus Copeland Deal (December 7, 1917 – March 14, 2005) was an American football running back in the National Football League (NFL) for the former Washington Redskins (now the Washington Commanders).  He played college football at Auburn University and was drafted in the third round of the 1942 NFL Draft.

An Alabama native, Copeland attended high school in Tuscaloosa County, Alabama.

References
https://www.tuscaloosanews.com/story/news/2005/03/16/rufus-copeland-deal/27883027007/

External links
 
 

1917 births
2005 deaths
People from Moundville, Alabama
Players of American football from Alabama
American football running backs
Auburn Tigers football players
Washington Redskins players